"The Reckoning" is a single by American heavy metal band Iced Earth.

The single was released in October 2003, but originally the band had planned to release the album The Glorious Burden (from which the tracks on "The Reckoning" are taken from) in October 2003, but after the band was forced to move the album's release date due to singer Matt Barlow's departure from the band, record company released "The Reckoning" in order to fill in the gap. "The Reckoning" was also the first Iced Earth release from to feature lead vocalist Tim "Ripper" Owens.

The single contains three tracks: "The Reckoning (Don't Tread on Me)", an unplugged version of "When the Eagle Cries", "Valley Forge" and "Hollow Man". The last three songs were included because they were considered the "softest" tracks from The Glorious Burden and were the most likely to get radio airplay. The title-track was included in order to show fans that band was still as intense as ever. A music video was also filmed for the title-track.

The unplugged version of "When the Eagle Cries" was only released on "The Reckoning" and the limited edition of The Glorious Burden. A music video was also shot for the track.

Track listing

Personnel

 Iced Earth
 Jon Schaffer - rhythm guitar, backing vocals, co-producer
 Tim 'Ripper' Owens - lead vocals
 James MacDonough - bass guitar
 Richard Christy - drums

 Other personnel
 Jim Morris - lead guitar, co-producer
 Ralph Santolla - lead guitar
 Matt Barlow - backing vocals
 Howard Helm - piano
 Sam King - backing vocals
 Jeff Day - backing vocals
 Leo Hao - cover art

References

2003 singles
Iced Earth songs
2003 songs
Songs written by Jon Schaffer
American patriotic songs